Erika Venegas González (born July 7, 1988) is a Mexican former footballer who played as a goalkeeper for the Mexico women's national football team.

References

External links
 

1988 births
Living people
2011 FIFA Women's World Cup players
Footballers at the 2011 Pan American Games
Mexican women's footballers
Mexico women's international footballers
Women's association football goalkeepers
Pan American Games medalists in football
Pan American Games bronze medalists for Mexico
Medalists at the 2011 Pan American Games